Titus Mountain or Titus as it is colloquially known, is a popular downhill ski area spread over 3 mountains of northern New York,  south of the Village of Malone, in the Town of Malone, in Franklin County, New York. Titus is part of the Adirondack Mountains. The ski area boasts 50 trails and glades over three inter-connected mountains. Titus operates 10 lifts, as well as a two-lane tubing hill.

Resort statistics
Annual snowfall: 
Total area size: 
Number of Lifts: 10
Number of Trails/Glades/Parks: 50

References

External links
 Titus Mountain Website

Mountains of Franklin County, New York
Ski areas and resorts in New York (state)
Mountains of New York (state)